Swainson Howden Akroyd (13 November 1848 – 5 December 1925) was an English first-class cricketer. He was a right-handed batsman. He was born in Streatham, Surrey, and was educated at Radley College.

Akroyd made his first-class debut for Surrey in 1869 against Oxford University at The Oval, and was captain of Surrey in 1869 and 1870. He made his highest first-class score of 87 against Sussex in 1872. He played 33 first-class matches between 1869 and 1878, scoring 930 runs at an average of 17.22. For Surrey he played 23 matches, scoring 622 runs at an average of 15.55.

He died in Marylebone, London on 5 December 1925. His brother Bayly Akroyd also played first-class cricket.

References

External links
 Swainson Akroyd at ESPNcricinfo
 Swainson Akroyd at CricketArchive

1848 births
1925 deaths
People from Streatham
People educated at Radley College
English cricketers
Surrey cricketers
Surrey cricket captains
Gentlemen of England cricketers
Gentlemen of Marylebone Cricket Club cricketers
North v South cricketers